Bapatla Engineering College (BEC)  is a private college and one of the seven educational institutions sponsored by the Bapatla Education Society. BEC was established in 1981.

References

All India Council for Technical Education
Engineering colleges in Andhra Pradesh
1981 establishments in Andhra Pradesh
Educational institutions established in 1981